The University of Chicago Booth School of Business, also known as Chicago Booth, is the graduate business school of the University of Chicago, a private research university in Chicago, Illinois. Founded in 1898, Chicago Booth is the second-oldest business school in the U.S. and is associated with 10 Nobel laureates in the Economic Sciences, more than any other business school in the world. The school has the third-largest endowment of any business school.

Notable Chicago Booth alumni include James O. McKinsey, founder of McKinsey & Company; Susan Wagner, co-founder of Blackrock; Eric Kriss, co-founder of Bain Capital; Satya Nadella, current CEO of Microsoft; and other current and former CEOs of Fortune 500 companies such as Allstate Insurance, Booz Allen Hamilton, Cargill, Chevron, Credit Suisse, Dominos, Goldman Sachs, IBM, Morgan Stanley, Morningstar, PIMCO, and Reckitt Benckiser.

History
The University of Chicago Booth School of Business traces its roots back to 1898 when university faculty member James Laurence Laughlin chartered the College of Commerce and Politics, which was intended to be an extension of the school's founding principles of "scientific guidance and investigation of great economic and social matters of everyday importance." The program originally served as a solely undergraduate institution until 1916, when academically oriented research masters and later doctoral-level degrees were introduced.

In 1916, the school was renamed the School of Commerce and Administration. Soon after in 1922, the first doctorate program was offered at the school. In 1932, the school was rechristened as the School of Business. The School of Business offered its first Master of Business Administration (MBA) in 1935. A landmark decision was taken by the school at about this time to concentrate its resources solely on graduate programs, and accordingly, the undergraduate program was phased out in 1942. In 1943, the school launched the first Executive MBA program. The school was renamed to Graduate School of Business (or more popularly, the GSB) in 1959, a name that it held till 2008.  That year alumnus David G. Booth gave the school a gift valued at $300 million, and in honor of the gift the school was renamed the University of Chicago Booth School of Business.

During the latter half of the twentieth century, the business school was instrumental in the development of the Chicago School of economics, an economic philosophy focused on free-market, minimal government involvement, due to faculty and student interaction with members of the university's influential Department of Economics.  Other innovations by the school include initiating the first PhD program in business (1920), founding the first academic business journal (1928), offering the first Executive MBA (EMBA) program (1943), and for offering the first weekend MBA program (1986). Students at the school founded the National Black MBA Association (1972), and it is the only U.S. business school with permanent campuses on three continents: Asia (2000), Europe (1994), and North America (1898).

Campuses
In Chicago, the Booth School has two campuses: the Charles M. Harper Center in Hyde Park, which houses the school's full-time MBA and Ph.D. programs, and the Gleacher Center in downtown Chicago, which hosts the part-time Evening and Weekend MBA Programs, Chicago-based Executive MBA Program,  and Executive Education courses. Chicago Booth also has a campus in London, a short walk from St Paul's Cathedral, hosting the EMBA Program in Europe and Executive Education classes. Lastly, Chicago Booth has a campus in Hong Kong, located in the Hong Kong Jockey Club University of Chicago Academic Complex.

Academics
Chicago Booth offers Full-time, Part-time (Evening and Weekend) and Executive MBA programs.  The university is also a major center for educating future academics, with graduate programs offering the A.M. and Ph.D. degrees in several fields. In addition to conducting graduate business programs, the school conducts research in the fields of finance, economics, quantitative marketing research, and accounting, among others.

Academic concentrations
Students in the Full-time MBA, Executive MBA, and Part-time MBA programs can concentrate in one or more of 14 areas, although some concentrations' required coursework may necessitate schedule modifications for students enrolled in the part-time program.

Honors
Chicago Booth grants "High Honors" to the top five percent of the graduating class and "Honors" to its next 15 percent, based on GPA averages of all MBA graduates from the previous academic year.

Research and learning centers

The school promotes and disseminates research through its centers and institutes; the most significant ones are:

Accounting Research Center
Applied Theory Initiative  
Center for Decision Research  
Center for Population Economics  
Center for Research in Security Prices  
Chicago Energy Initiative
Fama-Miller Center for Research in Finance
George J. Stigler Center for the Study of the Economy and the State  
Initiative on Global Markets
Michael P. Polsky Center for Entrepreneurship and Innovation 
The Becker Friedman Institute for Research in Economics  
James M. Kilts Center for Marketing 
Rustandy Center for Social Sector Innovation

Rankings

Chicago Booth was ranked #1 by both Forbes and The Economist in 2019.  U.S. News & World Report ranks Chicago Booth in 2023 as the #1 business school in the United States. U.S. News also ranked the school's executive MBA program #1 and its part-time program #1 in the U.S. In 2019, The Economist ranked the school's full-time MBA program as #1 globally. The Economist also ranked Chicago #1 each year from 2012 to 2016. The Financial Times Rankings 2019 gave Chicago Booth the third place in Open Executive Education. Poets and Quants ranked the school #2 in their 2019 ranking.

People

Faculty 

The Booth school has 177 professors, and includes Nobel laureates Eugene Fama and Richard Thaler and MacArthur Fellow Kevin M. Murphy. Other notable economists at the school include John H. Cochrane, Luigi Zingales and Raghuram Rajan, and former Chairperson of the Council of Economic Advisers, Austan Goolsbee.

Alumni

The Chicago Booth Alumni has a community of over 49,000 members and is supported by 60+ alumni clubs worldwide. Alumni include Satya Nadella, Jon Corzine, Peter G. Peterson, Philip J. Purcell, Todd Young, Howard Marks, Megan McArdle, John Meriwether, and Susan Wagner.

Publications 
Chicago Booth currently publishes three academic journals:
Journal of Accounting Research
Journal of Law and Economics
Journal of Political Economy (with the Department of Economics)

Chicago Booth Review 
Chicago Booth Review is a magazine devoted to business research, particularly research conducted by Chicago Booth's own faculty. In addition to covering new findings in finance, behavioral science, economics, entrepreneurship, accounting, marketing, and other business-relevant subjects, the magazine features essays from Chicago Booth faculty and other academics. It is published quarterly in print and several times a week online.

Chicago Booth Review is the most recent of several successive vehicles Chicago Booth has used to convey its intellectual capital to an outside audience. Starting in the 1960s, the school published the Selected Papers series, a collection of articles written by faculty members or excerpted from faculty speeches. In 1997, Booth launched Capital Ideas as a separate newsletter featuring articles about faculty research. That subsequently evolved into a quarterly magazine, which in 2016 relaunched as Chicago Booth Review.

See also 
Glossary of economics
List of United States business school rankings
List of business schools in the United States

References

External links

Guide to the University of Chicago Graduate School of Business Records 1935-1976 at the University of Chicago Special Collections Research Center

University of Chicago Booth School of Business
 
Rafael Viñoly buildings
Educational institutions established in 1898
Schools of the University of Chicago
1898 establishments in Illinois